USS Grayback may refer to the following vessels of the United States Navy:

United States Navy ship names